Nice Côte d'Azur Airport  is an international airport located  southwest of Nice, in the Alpes-Maritimes départment of France. It is the third busiest airport in France and serves as a focus city for Air France and an operating base for easyJet. In 2019, it handled 14,485,423 passengers.

Due to its proximity to the Principality of Monaco, it also serves as the city-state's airport, with helicopter service linking the principality and airport. Some airlines market Monaco as a destination via Nice Airport.

Facilities 

The airport covers an area of over  partially reclaimed from the sea, with  used by its two parallel runways and the three passenger terminals and freight terminal. The airport's theoretical capacity is 13 million annual passengers and 52 movements (26 landings) per hour. Terminals 1 and 2 are linked by a tram service. The route stops at the airport and connects with the city centre via the “Jean Médecin” station, and with the port via the “Port Lympia” station. Buses that also connect the car parks with the terminals.

Terminal 1
It features flights to domestic, Schengen and non-Schengen destinations and has a capacity of 4.5 million passengers per year. A business center is located at Terminal 1 containing eight rooms and a conference room with a capacity of 250 people.

Terminal 2
Terminal 2 is the newer and larger facility and is equipped to handle flights to all destinations. The terminal has a capacity of 8.5 million passengers per year.

Business Aviation Terminal
Opened in 2010, this terminal contains the operations rooms, VIP lounges, crew lounges and offices of several business aviation companies.

Airlines and destinations

Passenger 

The following airlines operate regular scheduled and charter flights to and from Nice:

Cargo

Statistics

Ground transportation 
The airport is located on the western end of the Promenade des Anglais. Since December 2018, Nice tramway line 2 connects the airport to the Port of Nice (Lympia Port) via the Grand Arénas interchange (where additionally the relocated regional train station Nice-Saint-Augustin is situated), replacing two former bus routes (98 and 99) to the airport. The tram runs every 8 minutes during the day. There's also tramway line 3 which runs form the airport to the western suburbs. Additionally, bus route 12 connects the airport with Promenade des Artes via the old town.

Société Naviplane Ferry

In 1969 an experimental and short-lived ferry service utilized two N.300 Naviplane hovercraft. The airport was connected to Cannes, Saint-Tropez, Monaco and San-Remo.

Accidents and incidents
 On 9 April 1949, SNCASE Languedoc P/7 F-BATU of Air France overran the runway and was damaged beyond economic repair.
 On 3 March 1952, SNCASE Languedoc P/7 F-BCUM of Air France crashed shortly after take-off, killing all 38 people on board. The cause of the accident was that the aileron controls had jammed. The aircraft was operating a domestic scheduled passenger flight from Nice to Orly Airport, Paris.

See also
 List of the busiest airports in France

References

External links 

 Aéroport Nice Côte d'Azur (official site)
 Aéroport de Nice – Côte d'Azur (Union des Aéroports Français) 
 
 
 Live Flight Information for NCE

1929 establishments in France
Airports established in 1929
Airports in Provence-Alpes-Côte d'Azur
Airport
Airport